William Cowart White (born November 20, 1978) is an American former professional baseball pitcher. He played in Major League Baseball (MLB) for the Texas Rangers.

Career
White's contract was purchased by the Rangers from Oklahoma on August 25, 2007. He was outrighted to the minors on October 1, after posting a 9.45 ERA during the season.

In January , he signed a minor league contract with the Chicago Cubs. However, on  February 20, he was released after failing a physical. On December 18, 2009, White signed a minor league contract with the Philadelphia Phillies.

On April 9, 2010, White signed with the Long Island Ducks of the Atlantic League of Professional Baseball.

External links

1978 births
Living people
Baseball players from Louisville, Kentucky
Major League Baseball pitchers
Texas Rangers players
South Bend Silver Hawks players
El Paso Diablos players
Yakima Bears players
Lancaster JetHawks players
Tennessee Smokies players
Frisco RoughRiders players
Oklahoma RedHawks players
Jacksonville State Gamecocks baseball players
Meridian Eagles baseball players
Long Island Ducks players
Arizona League Diamondbacks players
Bakersfield Blaze players